Yingshang North railway station is a railway station on the Shangqiu–Hangzhou high-speed railway in Yingshang County, Fuyang, Anhui, China. Opened on 1 December 2019, it lies significantly closer to the urban population than the conventional Yingshang railway station.

References

Railway stations in Anhui
Railway stations in China opened in 2019